Dimitrios Pappas (born 25 February 1980 in Ioannina) is a Greek former footballer and current football manager. He most recently managed Rot-Weiß Oberhausen.

Personal life
He starred alongside his girlfriend Rebecca Fuhrländer in the German Scripted Reality show "mieten, kaufen, wohnen".

References

1980 births
Living people
Greek footballers
Rot-Weiss Essen players
Rot-Weiß Oberhausen players
2. Bundesliga players
3. Liga players
Expatriate footballers in Germany
Association football defenders
Footballers from Ioannina
Rot-Weiß Oberhausen managers